Claire Febvay (born 16 July 1982 in Oullins) is a French diver.

She competed in the women's platform diving events at the 2000 Summer Olympics (35th place), the 2004 Summer Olympics (33rd place), and the 2008 Summer Olympics (25th place).

References

External links
 

1982 births
Living people
French female divers
Olympic divers of France
Divers at the 2000 Summer Olympics
Divers at the 2004 Summer Olympics
Divers at the 2008 Summer Olympics
People from Oullins
Sportspeople from Lyon Metropolis